The Journal of Consumer Affairs is a peer-reviewed academic journal that was established in 1967 and is published by Wiley-Blackwell on behalf of the American Council on Consumer Interests. It covers research on consumer behavior, consumer and household decision making, and the implications of practices and policies on consumers' wellbeing. According to the Journal Citation Reports, the journal has a 2017 impact factor of 1.860.

References

External links
 
 American Council on Consumer Interests

Business and management journals
Publications established in 1967
Wiley-Blackwell academic journals
English-language journals
Works about consumerism
Triannual journals